Daryl Austin may refer to:

Daryl Austin (journalist) (born 1982), American journalist
Daryl Austin (painter) (born 1964), Australian painter